Tulsiram Abaji Patil (September 1917 – 19 November 2007) was an Indian politician. He was elected to the Lok Sabha, the lower house of the Parliament of India as a member of the Indian National Congress.

Patil died in Latur, Maharashtra on 19 November 2007, at the age of 90.

References

External links
Official biographical sketch in Parliament of India website

1917 births
2007 deaths
India MPs 1962–1967
India MPs 1967–1970
India MPs 1971–1977
Lok Sabha members from Maharashtra